Schaler Aa is a river of Lower Saxony and North Rhine-Westphalia, Germany. It flows into the Große Aa south of Freren.

The river springs as Weeser Aa southeast of the Ankum Heights and east of Merzen in Lower Saxony. After crossing the boundary between Lower Saxony and North Rhine-Westphalia, it changes it name into Halverder Aa and near  (a district of Hopsten) into Halverder-Schaler Aa. Near  (a district of Hopsten), it changes its name again into Schaler Aa. Finally, it discharges into the Große Aa south of Freren.

See also
List of rivers of Lower Saxony
List of rivers of North Rhine-Westphalia

References

Rivers of Lower Saxony
Rivers of North Rhine-Westphalia
Rivers of Germany